Il prezzo della gloria is a 1955 Italian war film. It stars actor Gabriele Ferzetti.

Plot 
The story takes place on the torpedo boat Sparviero and focuses on the disagreement between the unit commander, Alberto Bruni, and his first officer, Lieutenant Stefano Valli, second in command. But the commander is wounded, and then his collaborator concludes the dangerous mission alone.

Cast
Gabriele Ferzetti: Comm. Alberto Bruni
Dina Perbellini: Aunt Dora
Pierre Cressoy:Lt. Stefano Valli
Nino Marchetti:  Ruggero's father
Anita Durante:  Aunt Bettina
Mike Bongiorno: Ruggero Grimaldi
Fiorella Mari: Luisa 
Riccardo Garrone:  Morabito
Liliana Gerace:  Ms. Sandri 
Eleonora Rossi Drago

References

External links

1955 films
1955 war films
Italian war films
1950s Italian-language films
Films scored by Carlo Rustichelli
Films set in the Mediterranean Sea
World War II naval films
1950s Italian films